Spaceway-1  was a part of AT&T's constellation of direct broadcast satellites. The satellite was launched via a Zenit-3SL rocket from Sea Launch's Odyssey equatorial platform on 26 April 2005. Spaceway-1 was a Boeing 702-model satellite with a 12-year life expectancy. It provided high-definition television to DirecTV customers with its Ka-band communications payload. DirecTV did not make use of the broadband capabilities on Spaceway-1 even though it was originally built by Boeing for this purpose.

History 
Spaceway-1 was the heaviest commercial communications satellite 6080 kg ever put into orbit until iPSTAR-1 (6775 kg) was launched by Arianespace on 11 August 2005.

T10 was co-located with Spaceway-1 in order to use the 500 MHz of unused spectrum for HDTV broadcasting. This spectrum was originally intended for the broadband internet capabilities of the two Spaceway satellites which were disabled by Hughes Network Systems at the request of DirecTV.

Retirement 
During its last years, Spaceway-1 mainly served as a backup satellite. In December 2019, the satellite suffered significant and irreversible thermal damage to its battery in December 2019, forcing it to rely only on power generated from its solar arrays and prompting AT&T to request the spacecraft be decommissioned before February 25, 2020 to prevent the risk of the spacecraft exploding. The satellite was moved into a graveyard orbit above the geostationary orbit and decommissioned in February 2020.

References

External links 
 

Satellites using the BSS-702 bus
Communications satellites in geostationary orbit
Spacecraft launched by Zenit and Energia rockets
DirecTV
Spacecraft decommissioned in 2020